Lochalsh is a community in Huron County, Ontario.

References

Communities in Huron County, Ontario